Method & Red, sometimes written Meth and Red, is an American television sitcom that originally ran on Fox from June 16 to September 15, 2004. It starred hip hop recording artists Method Man & Redman, portraying fictionalized versions of themselves who move to a predominantly white upper-class suburb in New Jersey.

Fox cancelled the show with 4 of the 13 episodes remaining unaired after heated meetings with Method Man and Redman, who were not pleased with the show. The duo publicly criticized Fox several times after this.

Method Man criticized the series for having a laugh track and Fox doing a bad job on editing. He had wanted it to be in the vein of Arrested Development, of which he is a fan.

Cast
 Method Man as himself
 Redman as himself
 Anna Maria Horsford as Dorothy
 Beth Littleford as Nancy Blaford
 David Henrie as Skyler Blaford
 Jeremiah Birkett as Dupree
 Lahmard Tate as Lil' Bit
 Peter Jacobson as Bill Blaford

Episodes

References

External links
 

2000s American black sitcoms
2004 American television series debuts
2004 American television series endings
African-American television
English-language television shows
Fox Broadcasting Company original programming
Hip hop television
Television shows set in New Jersey
2000s American single-camera sitcoms
Television series by 20th Century Fox Television